Pietro Leone (31 January 1888 – 4 February 1958) was an Italian footballer who played as a midfielder. He competed for Italy in the men's football tournament at the 1912 Summer Olympics.

References

External links
 

1888 births
1958 deaths
Italian footballers
Italy international footballers
Olympic footballers of Italy
Footballers at the 1912 Summer Olympics
People from Biella
Association football midfielders
F.C. Pro Vercelli 1892 players
F.C. Pro Vercelli 1892 managers
Italian football managers
U.S. Salernitana 1919 managers
Footballers from Piedmont
Sportspeople from the Province of Biella